Batrachedrodes sophroniella is a moth of the family Momphidae. It was first described by Lord Walsingham in 1907. It is endemic to the Hawaiian islands of Oahu, Maui and Hawaii.

The larvae feed at times abundantly on the sporangia of Dryopteris cyatheoides. The larvae feed protected by a web. When there are no more sporangia, they feed on the undersurface of the frond, eating away the parenchyma and leaving the upper epidermis which then shows as dead spots. Pupation takes place within a cocoon alongside of the midrib of a pinna.

References

External links

Momphidae
Endemic moths of Hawaii
Moths described in 1907